The saat phere (sāt phéré,  'seven circumambulations') is one of the most important features of the Hindu Wedding, involving seven rounds around a sacred fire lit for the purpose amidst the Vedic mantras. The bride and groom circumambulate a consecrated fire seven times, reciting specific vows with each circuit (Sanskrit: parikrama). Vows made in the presence of the sacred fire (Sanskrit: agni) are considered unbreakable, with Agnideva (lit. God/Lord of Fire; c.f. Latin cognates: ignis+deus) held as both witnessing and blessing the couple's union. Every phera taken holds a specific meaning.
And in according to vedas [parikrama] is from origin of hindu dharma, according to vedas it is lords ritual of acceptances of soul.

Seven pheras
The Saat phere or the seven pradakshinas (circumambulations) are as follows:

 In the first round or phera, the couple prays to God for plenty of nourishing and pure food. They pray to God to let them walk together so that they will get food.
 In the second round or phera, the couple prays to God for a healthy and prosperous life. They ask for the physical, spiritual and mental health from God.
 In the third phera, the couple prays to God for wealth.They ask God for the strength for both of them so that they can share the happiness and pain together. Also, they pray so that they can walk together to get wealth.
 In the fourth round, the couple prays to God for the increase in love and respect for each other and their respective families. 
 In the fifth round, the bride and groom together pray for the beautiful, heroic and noble children from God.
 In the sixth round around the fire, the couple asks for the peaceful long life with each other.
 In the final seventh round, the couple prays to god for companionship, togetherness, loyalty and understanding between themselves.They ask God to make them friends and give the maturity to carry out the friendship for lifetime. The husband says to his new wife that now they have become friends after the Seven Vows/Saat Phere and they will not break their friendship in life.

 Alt

The vows taken in each phera are as below:
With the first phera, the couple invokes the gods for the plenitude of pure and nourishing food and a life that is noble and respectful.
With the second phera the couple prays for physical and mental strength and to lead a healthy and peaceful life.
The third phera is taken for the fulfilment of spiritual obligations. The gods are invoked for blessing the couple with spiritual strength.
The fourth phera is taken for the attainment of happiness and harmony through mutual love and trust and a long joyous life together. 
The fifth phera is taken to pray for the welfare of all living entities in the entire universe and for begetting noble children.
The sixth phera is for bountiful seasons all over the world. The couple prays for bountiful seasons and seeks that they may go through these seasons together, just as they would share their joys and sorrows.
With the last phera they pray for a life of understanding, loyalty, unity and companionship not only for themselves but also for the peace of the universe.

Having exchanged these vows of love, duty, respect, fidelity and a fruitful union the couple agree to be companions forever. The process of saat phere acquires more significance in that the couple prays for the peace and well-being of the entire universe.

Hindu marriage is a symbol of purity, sacred union of two different people from the community and culture. All the Hindu marriages carry out similar rituals with minor differences.

See also
Vivaah

Hindu wedding rituals